Startup Games is an Austin-based non-profit that hosts a series of events centered on competition between tech startups in games common to startup culture. Founded in 2012, the organization holds several annual competitions, with each company playing on behalf of a charity of their choice.

History

Past events
Startup Games was founded in 2012 with the original name of Austin Startup Olympics. The inaugural games were held on January 21, 2012 at uShip’s headquarters and featured Adlucent, Boundless Network, BuildASign, Mass Relevance (now part of Spredfast), SpareFoot, Spredfast, uShip and WhaleShark Media (now RetailMeNot). uShip won the inaugural Startup Games competition.

The organization’s only Summer Games edition took place on June 9, 2012. BuildASign was the winning team.

SpareFoot won the next three Austin editions of Startup Games from 2013 to 2015, playing for Kure It Cancer Research.

Startup Games held its first Startup Games: Level Up event on April 11, 2015. This event is for companies larger than 250 employees. BuildASign was the winning team.

Impact and growth
To date, Startup Games has donated more than $175,000 to charities and is expanding to other startup communities, with San Antonio, New York and Chicago scheduled for 2015.

Leadership
Startup Games was founded as a collaboration between the eight original competing companies. It has since been independently incorporated as a non-profit company with one of the founding members, Gillian Wilson, serving as President.

References

External links
 Startup Games Official Website
 Startup Games Media Links

American companies established in 2012
Companies based in Austin, Texas
Video game companies based in Texas